Kurisumuttom is in one of the beautiful province Pathanamthitta in Kerala, India. It is in between Thiruvalla and Ranny. It is a beautiful place blessed with hills, valleys, streams etc.

References 

Villages in Pathanamthitta district